Shakhi is a rural locality (a selo) and the administrative center of Shakhovsky Selsoviet of Pavlovsky District, Altai Krai, Russia. The population was 1,745 in 2016. There are 20 streets.

Geography 
Shakhi is located 33 km east of Pavlovsk (the district's administrative centre) by road. Novomikhaylovka is the nearest rural locality.

References 

Rural localities in Pavlovsky District, Altai Krai